A spear is a pole weapon consisting of a shaft, usually of wood, with a pointed head. The head may be simply the sharpened end of the shaft itself, as is the case with fire hardened spears, or it may be made of a more durable material fastened to the shaft, such as bone, flint, obsidian, iron, steel, or bronze. The most common design for hunting or combat spears since ancient times has incorporated a metal spearhead shaped like a triangle, lozenge, or leaf. The heads of fishing spears usually feature barbs or serrated edges.

The word spear comes from the Old English spere, from the Proto-Germanic speri, from a Proto-Indo-European root *sper- "spear, pole".
Spears can be divided into two broad categories: those designed for thrusting as a melee weapon and those designed for throwing as a ranged weapon (usually referred to as   javelins or darts).

The spear has been used throughout human history both as a hunting and fishing tool and as a weapon. Along with the club, knife, and axe, it is one of the earliest and most important tools developed by early humans. As a weapon, it may be wielded with either one or two hands. It was used in virtually every conflict up until the modern era, where even then it continues on in the form of the fixed bayonet on a long gun, and is probably the most commonly used weapon in history.

Origins
Spear manufacture and use is not confined to humans. It is also practiced by the western chimpanzee. Chimpanzees near Kédougou, Senegal have been observed to create spears by breaking straight limbs off trees, stripping them of their bark and side branches, and sharpening one end with their teeth. They then used the weapons to hunt galagos sleeping in hollows.

Prehistory

Archaeological evidence found in present-day Germany documents that wooden spears have been used for hunting since at least 400,000 years ago, and a 2012 study from the site of Kathu Pan in South Africa suggests that hominids, possibly Homo heidelbergensis, may have developed the technology of hafted stone-tipped spears in Africa about 500,000 years ago. Wood does not preserve well, however, and Craig Stanford, a primatologist and professor of anthropology at the University of Southern California, has suggested that the discovery of spear use by chimpanzees means that early humans may have used wooden spears before this.

Neanderthals were constructing stone spear heads from as early as 300,000 BP, and by 250,000 years ago, wooden spears were made with fire-hardened points.

From circa 200,000 BC onwards, Middle Paleolithic humans began to make complex stone blades with flaked edges which were used as spear heads. These stone heads could be fixed to the spear shaft by gum or resin or by bindings made of animal sinew, leather strips or vegetable matter. During this period, a clear difference remained between spears designed to be thrown and those designed to be used in hand-to-hand combat. By the Magdalenian period (c. 15,000–9500 BC), spear-throwers similar to the later atlatl were in use.

Military

Europe

Classical antiquity

Ancient Greeks

The spear is the main weapon of the warriors of Homer's Iliad. The use of both a single thrusting spear and two throwing spears are mentioned. It has been suggested that two styles of combat are being described; an early style, with thrusting spears, dating to the Mycenaean period in which the Iliad is set, and, anachronistically, a later style, with throwing spears, from Homer's own Archaic period.

In the 7th century BC, the Greeks evolved a new close-order infantry formation, the phalanx. The key to this formation was the hoplite, who was equipped with a large, circular, bronze-faced shield (aspis) and a  spear with an iron head and bronze butt-spike (doru). The hoplite phalanx dominated warfare among the Greek City States from the 7th into the 4th century BC.

The 4th century saw major changes. One was the greater use of peltasts, light infantry armed with spear and javelins. The other was the development of the sarissa, a two-handed pike  in length, by the Macedonians under Phillip of Macedon and Alexander the Great. The pike phalanx, supported by peltasts and cavalry, became the dominant mode of warfare among the Greeks from the late 4th century onward until Greek military systems were supplanted by the Roman legions.

Ancient Romans

In the pre-Marian Roman armies, the first two lines of battle, the hasttati and principes, often fought with a sword called a gladius and pila, heavy javelins that were specifically designed to be thrown at an enemy to pierce and foul a target's shield. Originally the principes were armed with a short spear called a hasta, but these gradually fell out of use, eventually being replaced by the gladius. The third line, the triarii, continued to use the hasta.

From the late 2nd century BC, all legionaries were equipped with the pilum. The pilum continued to be the standard legionary spear until the end of the 2nd century AD. Auxilia, however, were equipped with a simple hasta and, perhaps, javelins or darts. During the 3rd century AD, although the pilum continued to be used, legionaries usually were equipped with other forms of throwing and thrusting spear, similar to auxilia of the previous century. By the 4th century, the pilum had effectively disappeared from common use.

In the late period of the Roman Empire, the spear became more often used because of its anti-cavalry capacities as the barbarian invasions were often conducted by people with a developed culture of cavalry in warfare.

Medieval period
After the fall of the Western Roman Empire, the spear and shield continued to be used by nearly all Western European cultures. Since a medieval spear required only a small amount of steel along the sharpened edges (most of the spear-tip was wrought iron), it was an economical weapon. Quick to manufacture, and needing less smithing skill than a sword, it remained the main weapon of the common soldier. The Vikings, for instance, although often portrayed with axe or sword in hand, were armed mostly with spears, as were their Anglo-Saxon, Irish, or continental contemporaries.

Infantry

Broadly speaking, spears were either designed to be used in melee, or to be thrown. Within this simple classification, there was a remarkable range of types. For example, M. J. Swanton identified thirty different spearhead categories and sub-categories in early Saxon England. Most medieval spearheads were generally leaf-shaped. Notable types of early medieval spears include the angon, a throwing spear with a long head similar to the Roman pilum, used by the Franks and Anglo-Saxons, and the winged (or lugged) spear, which had two prominent wings at the base of the spearhead, either to prevent the spear penetrating too far into an enemy or to aid in spear fencing. Originally a Frankish weapon, the winged spear also was popular with the Vikings. It would become the ancestor of later medieval polearms, such as the partisan and spetum.

The thrusting spear also has the advantage of reach, being considerably longer than other weapon types. Exact spear lengths are hard to deduce as few spear shafts survive archaeologically but  would seem to have been the norm. Some nations were noted for their long spears, including the Scots and the Flemish. Spears usually were used in tightly ordered formations, such as the shield wall or the schiltron. To resist cavalry, spear shafts could be planted against the ground. William Wallace drew up his schiltrons in a circle at the Battle of Falkirk in 1298 to deter charging cavalry; this was a widespread tactic sometimes known as the "crown" formation. Thomas Randolph, 1st Earl of Moray used a circular schiltron on the first day of the Battle of Bannockburn. However, the rectangular schiltron was much more common and was used by King Robert the Bruce on the second day of the Battle of Bannockburn and in the Battle of Old Byland when he defeated English armies.

Throwing spears became rarer as the Middle Ages drew on, but survived in the hands of specialists such as the Catalan Almogavars. They were commonly used in Ireland until the end of the 16th century.

Spears began to lose fashion among the infantry during the 14th century, being replaced by pole weapons that combined the thrusting properties of the spear with the cutting properties of the axe, such as the halberd. Where spears were retained they grew in length, eventually evolving into pikes, which would be a dominant infantry weapon in the 16th and 17th centuries.

Cavalry
Cavalry spears were originally the same as infantry spears and were often used with two hands or held with one hand overhead. In the 12th century, after the adoption of stirrups and a high-cantled saddle, the spear became a decidedly more powerful weapon. A mounted knight would secure the lance by holding it with one hand and tucking it under the armpit (the couched lance technique) In combination with a lance rest, this allowed all the momentum of the horse and knight to be focused on the weapon's tip, whilst still retaining accuracy and control. This use of the spear spurred the development of the lance as a distinct weapon that was perfected in the medieval sport of jousting.

In the 14th century, tactical developments meant that knights and men-at-arms often fought on foot. As dismounting became commonplace, specialist pole weapons such as the pollaxe were adopted by knights and this practice ceased.

Introduction of gunpowder

The development of both the long, two-handed pike and gunpowder firearms in Renaissance Europe saw an ever-increasing focus on integrated infantry tactics. Those infantry not armed with these weapons carried variations on the polearm, including the halberd and the bill. At the start of the Renaissance, cavalry remained predominantly lance-armed; gendarmes with the heavy knightly lance and lighter cavalry with a variety of lighter lances. By the 1540s, however, pistol-armed cavalry called reiters were beginning to make their mark. Cavalry armed with pistols and other lighter firearms, along with a sword, had virtually replaced lance armed cavalry in Western Europe by the beginning of the 17th century.

Ultimately, the spear proper was rendered obsolete on the battlefield. Its last flowering was the half-pike or spontoon, a shortened version of the pike carried by officers of various ranks. While originally a weapon, this came to be seen more as a badge of office, or leading staff by which troops were directed. The half-pike, sometimes known as a boarding pike, was also used as a weapon on board ships until the late 19th century.

Middle East

Modern era

Muslim warriors used a spear that was called an az-zaġāyah. Berbers pronounced it zaġāya, but the English term, derived from the Old French via Berber, is "assegai". It is a pole weapon used for throwing or hurling, usually a light spear or javelin made of hard wood and pointed with a forged iron tip. The az-zaġāyah played an important role during the Islamic conquest as well as during later periods, well into the 20th century. A longer pole az-zaġāyah was being used as a hunting weapon from horseback. The az-zaġāyah was widely used. It existed in various forms in areas stretching from Southern Africa to the Indian subcontinent, although these places already had their own variants of the spear. This javelin was the weapon of choice during the Fulani jihad as well as during the Mahdist War in Sudan. It is still being used by certain wandering Sufi ascetics (Derwishes).

Asia

China

In the Chinese martial arts, the Chinese spear (Qiang 槍) is popularly known as the "king of weapons". The spear is listed in the group of the four major weapons (along with the gun (staff), dao (a single-edged blade similar to a sabre), and the jian (sword)).

Spears were used first as hunting weapons amongst the ancient Chinese. They became popular as infantry weapons during the Warring States and Qin era, when spearmen were used as especially highly disciplined soldiers in organized group attacks. When used in formation fighting, spearmen would line up their large rectangular or circular shields in a shieldwall manner. The Qin also employed long spears (more akin to a pike) in formations similar to Swiss pikemen in order to ward off cavalry. The Han Empire would use similar tactics as its Qin predecessors. Halberds, polearms, and dagger axes were also common weapons during this time.

Spears were also common weaponry for Warring States, Qin, and Han era cavalry units. During these eras, the spear would develop into a longer lance-like weapon used for cavalry charges.

There are many words in Chinese that would be classified as a spear in English. The Mao is the predecessor of the Qiang. The first bronze Mao appeared in the Shang dynasty. This weapon was less prominent on the battlefield than the ge (dagger-axe). In some archaeological examples two tiny holes or ears can be found in the blade of the spearhead near the socket, these holes were presumably used to attach tassels, much like modern day wushu spears.

In the early Shang, the Mao appeared to have a relatively short shaft as well as a relatively narrow shaft as opposed to Mao in the later Shang and Western Zhou period. Some Mao from this era are heavily decorated as is evidenced by a Warring States period Mao from the Ba Shu area.

In the Han dynasty the Mao and the Ji (戟 Ji can be loosely defined as a halberd) rose to prominence in the military. Interesting to note is that the amount of iron Mao-heads found exceeds the number of bronze heads. By the end of the Han dynasty (Eastern Han) the process of replacement of the iron Mao had been completed and the bronze Mao had been rendered completely obsolete. After the Han dynasty toward the Sui and Tang dynasties the Mao used by cavalry were fitted with much longer shafts, as is mentioned above. During this era, the use of the Shuo (矟) was widespread among the footmen. The Shuo can be likened to a pike or simply a long spear.

After the Tang dynasty, the popularity of the Mao declined and was replaced by the Qiang (枪). The Tang dynasty divided the Qiang in four categories: "一曰漆枪， 二曰木枪， 三曰白杆枪， 四曰扑头枪。” Roughly translated the four categories are: Qi (a kind of wood) Spears, Wooden Spears, Bai Gan (A kind of wood) Spears and Pu Tou Qiang. The Qiang that were produced in the Song and Ming dynasties consisted of four major parts: Spearhead, Shaft, End Spike and Tassel. The types of Qiang that exist are many. Among the types there are cavalry Qiang that were the length of one zhang (aproximatelly ), Litte-Flower Spears (Xiao Hua Qiang 小花枪) that are the length of one person and their arm extended above his head, double hooked spears, single hooked spears, ringed spears and many more.

There is some confusion as to how to distinguish the Qiang from the Mao, as they are obviously very similar. Some people say that a Mao is longer than a Qiang, others say that the main difference is between the stiffness of the shaft, where the Qiang would be flexible and the Mao would be stiff. Scholars seem to lean toward the latter explanation more than the former. Because of the difference in the construction of the Mao and the Qiang, the usage is also different, though there is no definitive answer as to what exactly the differences are between the Mao and the Qiang.

India

Spears are known as Bhala in Indian languages. Spears in the Indian society were used both in missile and non-missile form, both by cavalry and foot-soldiers. Spears were constructed from a variety of materials such as the sang made completely of steel, and the ballam which had a bamboo shaft.

The Arab presence in Sindh and the Mameluks of Delhi introduced the Middle Eastern javelin into India.

The Rajputs wielded a type of spear for infantrymen which had a club integrated into the spearhead, and a pointed butt end. Other spears had forked blades, several spear-points, and numerous other innovations. One particular spear unique to India was the vita or corded lance.

Used by the Maratha army, it had a rope connecting the spear with the user's wrist, allowing the weapon to be thrown and pulled back. The Vel is a type of spear or lance, originated in Southern India, primarily used by Tamils.

Sikh Nihangs sometimes carry a spear even today. Spears were used in conflicts and training by armed paramilitary units such as the razakars of Nizams of Hyderabad State as late as the second half of the 20th century.

Japan

The hoko spear was used in ancient Japan sometime between the Yayoi period and the Heian period, but it became unpopular as early samurai often acted as horseback archers. Medieval Japan employed spears again for infantrymen to use, but it was not until the 11th century in that samurai began to prefer spears over bows. Several polearms were used in the Japanese theatres; the naginata was a glaive-like weapon with a long, curved blade popularly among the samurai and the Buddhist warrior-monks, often used against cavalry; the yari was a longer polearm, with a straight-bladed spearhead, which became the weapon of choice of both the samurai and the ashigaru (footmen) during the Warring States Era; the horseback samurai used shorter yari for his single-armed combat; on the other hand, ashigaru infantries used long yari (similar with European pike) for their massed combat formation.

Philippines

Filipino spears (sibat) were used as both a weapon and a tool throughout the Philippines. It is also called a bangkaw (after the Bankaw Revolt.), sumbling or palupad in the islands of Visayas and Mindanao. Sibat are typically made from rattan, either with a sharpened tip or a head made from metal. These heads may either be single-edged, double-edged or barbed. Styles vary according to function and origin. For example, a sibat designed for fishing may not be the same as those used for hunting.

The spear was used as the primary weapon in expeditions and battles against neighbouring island kingdoms and it became famous during the 1521 Battle of Mactan, where the chieftain Lapu Lapu of Cebu fought against Spanish forces led by Ferdinand Magellan who was subsequently killed.

Africa

The various types of the assegai (a light spear or javelin made of wood and pointed with iron or fire-hardened tip) were used throughout Africa and it was the most common weapon used before the introduction of firearms. The Zulu, Xhosa and other Nguni tribes of South Africa were renowned for their use of the assegai.
Shaka of the Zulu invented a shorter stabbing spear with a  shaft and a larger, broader blade one foot (0.3m) long. This weapon is otherwise known as the iklwa or ixwa, after the sound that was heard as it was withdrawn from the victim's wound. The traditional spear was not abandoned, but was used to range attack enemy formations before closing in for close quarters battle with the iklwa. This tactical combination originated during Shaka's military reforms. This weapon was typically used with one hand while the off hand held a cowhide shield for protection.

The Americas

West Mexico and South America (Pre-Colombia)
As advanced metallurgy was largely unknown in pre-Columbian America outside of Western Mexico and South America, most weapons in Meso-America were made of wood or obsidian. This did not mean that they were less lethal, as obsidian may be sharpened to become many times sharper than steel. Meso-American spears varied greatly in shape and size. While the Aztecs preferred the sword-like macuahuitl for fighting, the advantage of a far-reaching thrusting weapon was recognised, and a large portion of the army would carry the tepoztopilli into battle. The tepoztopilli was a polearm, and to judge from depictions in various Aztec codices, it was roughly the height of a man, with a broad wooden head about twice the length of the users' palm or shorter, edged with razor-sharp obsidian blades which were deeply set in grooves carved into the head, and cemented in place with bitumen or plant resin as an adhesive. The tepoztopilli was able both to thrust and slash effectively.

Throwing spears also were used extensively in Meso-American warfare, usually with the help of an atlatl. Throwing spears were typically shorter and more stream-lined than the tepoztopilli, and some had obsidian edges for greater penetration.

Native Americans

Typically, most spears made by Native Americans were created with materials surrounded by their communities. Usually, the shaft of the spear was made with a wooden stick while the head of the spear was fashioned from arrowheads, pieces of metal such as copper, or a bone that had been sharpened. Spears were a preferred weapon by many since it was inexpensive to create, could more easily be taught to others, and could be made quickly and in large quantities.

Native Americans used the buffalo pound method to kill buffalo, which required a hunter to dress as a buffalo and lure one into a ravine where other hunters were hiding. Once the buffalo appeared, the other hunters would kill him with spears. A variation of this technique, called the buffalo jump, was when a runner would lead the animals towards a cliff. As the buffalo got close to the cliff, other members of the tribe would jump out from behind rocks or trees and scare the buffalo over the cliff. Other hunters would be waiting at the bottom of the cliff to spear the animal to death.

Hunting

One of the earliest forms of killing prey for humans, hunting game with a spear and spear fishing continues to this day as both a means of catching food and as a cultural activity. Some of the most common prey for early humans were mega fauna such as mammoths which were hunted with various kinds of spear. One theory for the Quaternary extinction event was that most of these animals were hunted to extinction by humans with spears. Even after the invention of other hunting weapons such as the bow the spear continued to be used, either as a projectile weapon or used in the hand as was common in boar hunting.

Types

 Barred spears: A barred spear has a crossbar beneath the blade, to prevent too deep a penetration of the spear into an animal. The bar may be forged as part of the spearhead or may be more loosely tied by means of loops below the blade. Barred spears are known from the Bronze Age, but the first historical record of their use in Europe is found in the writings of Xenophon in the 5th century BC. Examples also are shown in Roman art. In the Middle Ages, a winged or lugged war-spear was developed (see above), but the later Middle Ages saw the development of specialised types, such as the boar-spear and the bear-spear. The boar-spear could be used both on foot or horseback.
 Javelin
 Harpoon
 Trident

Modern revival
Spear hunting fell out of favour in most of Europe in the 18th century, but continued in Germany, enjoying a revival in the 1930s. Spear hunting is still practiced in the United States. Animals taken are primarily wild boar and deer, although trophy animals such as cats and big game as large as a Cape Buffalo are hunted with spears. Alligators are hunted in Florida with a type of harpoon.

Gymnastics
One of the gymnastic exercises performed by the ancient Greeks was the throwing of a spear, referred to as ἀκυντισμός.

In myth and legend

Symbolism

Like many weapons, a spear may also be a symbol of power.

The Celts would symbolically destroy a dead warrior's spear either to prevent its use by another or as a sacrificial offering.

In classical Greek mythology Zeus' bolts of lightning may be interpreted as a symbolic spear. Some would carry that interpretation to the spear that frequently is associated with Athena, interpreting her spear as a symbolic connection to some of Zeus' power beyond the Aegis once he rose to replacing other deities in the pantheon. Athena was depicted with a spear prior to that change in myths, however. Chiron's wedding-gift to Peleus when he married the nymph Thetis in classical Greek mythology, was an ashen spear as the nature of ashwood with its straight grain made it an ideal choice of wood for a spear.

The Romans and their early enemies would force prisoners to walk underneath a 'yoke of spears', which humiliated them. The yoke would consist of three spears, two upright with a third tied between them at a height which made the prisoners stoop. It has been suggested that the arrangement has a magical origin, a way to trap evil spirits. The word subjugate has its origins in this practice (from Latin sub = under, jugum = yoke).

In Norse mythology, the god Odin's spear (named Gungnir) was made by the sons of Ivaldi. It had the special property that it never missed its mark. During the War with the Vanir, Odin symbolically threw Gungnir into the Vanir host. This practice of symbolically casting a spear into the enemy ranks at the start of a fight was sometimes used in historic clashes, to seek Odin's support in the coming battle. In Wagner's opera Siegfried, the haft of Gungnir is said to be from the "World-Tree" Yggdrasil.

Other spears of religious significance are the Holy Lance and the Lúin of Celtchar, believed by some to have vast mystical powers.

Sir James George Frazer in The Golden Bough noted the phallic nature of the spear and suggested that in the Arthurian legends the spear or lance functioned as a symbol of male fertility, paired with the Grail (as a symbol of female fertility).

The Hindu god of war Murugan is worshipped by Tamils in the form of the spear called Vel, which is his primary weapon.

The term spear is also used (in a somewhat archaic manner) to describe the male line of a family, as opposed to the distaff or female line.

Legends
Amenonuhoko, spear of Izanagi and Izanami, creator gods in Japanese mythology
Gáe Bulg, spear of Cúchulainn, hero in Irish mythology
Gáe Buide and Gáe Derg, spears of Diarmuid Ua Duibhne which could inflict wounds that none can recover from
Green Dragon Crescent Blade, a guan dao wielded by General Guan Yu in the Romance of the Three Kingdoms
Gungnir, spear of Odin, a god in Norse mythology
Holy Lance, said to be the spear that pierced the side of Jesus
Pelian Spear, a spear that only Achilles could wield, inherited from his father Peleus, made by Chiron from an ash tree on Mount Pelion.
Rhongomyniad referred to simply as  Ron ("spear") in Geoffrey of Monmouth's History of Britain, the spear of King Arthur.
Serpent Spear wielded by General Zhang Fei in the Romance of the Three Kingdoms 
Spear of Fuchai, the spear used by Goujian's arch-rival, King Fuchai of Wu, in China
Spear of Lugh, named after Lugh, a god in Irish mythology
Trident, a three-pronged fishing spear associated with a number of water deities, including the Etruscan Nethuns, Greek Poseidon, and Roman Neptune.
Trishula, a three-pronged spear wielded by the Hindu deities Durga and Shiva
Vel, a flattened broad tipped spear used by the Hindu deity Murugan

See also
 List of types of spears
 Viking Age arms and armour
 Projectile

Related weapons

 Arrow
 Assegai
 Atlatl
 Bill
 Dart
 Glaive
 Halberd
 Javelin
 Kontos
 Lance
 Naginata
 Pike
 Pilum
 Pole weapon
 Spear thrower
 Woomera
 Xyston

Notes and references

Primitive weapons
Polearms
Projectiles